The Amazonian streaked antwren (Myrmotherula multostriata) is a species of bird in the family Thamnophilidae. It is found in South America where its natural habitats are subtropical or tropical moist lowland forests and subtropical or tropical swamps.

Taxonomy
The Amazonian streaked antwren was described and illustrated by the English zoologist Philip Sclater in 1858 and given its current binomial name Myrmotherula multostriata.

Description
The male Amazonian streaked antwren has a black head, black upper parts streaked with white, a semi-concealed white dorsal patch, and black wings with two white bars. The underparts are white streaked with black. The female has an orange-rufous crown and nape but otherwise the upper parts are similar to the male. Her underparts are ochre with fine black streaks and a paler belly. The song is more musical than that of the Guianan streaked antwren. It also utters various trills and call notes.

Distribution and habitat
The Amazonian streaked antwren occurs in eastern Colombia, southern Venezuela, eastern Ecuador, eastern Peru, and western and central Brazil. The northernmost boundary of its range coincides with the Amazon River and the lower stretches of its left-bank tributary, the Rio Negro. The southernmost boundary is Mato Grosso and northern Bolivia. Its typical habitat is the undergrowth and middle storey of seasonally-flooded forest, swamps and the vicinity of rivers. It typically forages for spiders, caterpillars and other small invertebrate prey in pairs or small groups.

Conservation status
The Amazonian streaked antwren has a very wide range and is said to be fairly common in suitable habitat. The population trend is thought to be stable and the International Union for Conservation of Nature has rated the bird's conservation status as being of "least concern".

References

Further reading

Amazonian streaked antwren
Birds of the Amazon Basin
Amazonian streaked antwren
Amazonian streaked antwren
Taxonomy articles created by Polbot